Kiran Rao (born 7 November 1973) is an Indian film producer, screenwriter, and director who works in Hindi cinema. In 2016, Rao co-founded Paani Foundation, a non-profit organisation working towards the mission of fighting drought in Maharashtra.

She is the board member of Mumbai Academy of the Moving Image.

Early life
Kiran Rao was born on 7 November 1973 in Bangalore, and grew up in Kolkata. In 1992, her parents decided to leave Calcutta so she moved to Mumbai with Ajay Goyal. She graduated with a food sciences major from the Sophia College for Women in 1995. She attended the Social Communications Media course at the Sophia Polytechnic for two months, but then quit and left for Delhi. She got her master's degree at AJK Mass Communication Research Center at Jamia Millia Islamia, New Delhi. 

Actress Aditi Rao Hydari is Rao's first cousin. Rao's paternal and Hydari's maternal grandfather, J. Rameshwar Rao, was the Raja of Wanaparthy, a large estate under the Nizam of Hyderabad. Wanaparthy is a district of Telangana.

Career
Rao started her career as the assistant director in the epic film Lagaan directed by Ashutosh Gowariker, whom she also assisted later on Swades: We, the People. Lagaan was nominated for 74th Academy Awards in the foreign language film category. Aamir Khan produced and starred in the same film. Before Lagaan, she has also done minute role of supporting actress in Dil Chahta Hai. She also worked as second assistant director with Academy Award-nominated director Mira Nair on the indie hit Monsoon Wedding.

She scripted and directed the film Dhobi Ghat, which was released in January 2011 under Aamir Khan Productions. She has started writing her next film which will have roots in Kolkata.

Kiran Rao was made the chairperson of the Mumbai Film Festival - MAMI in 2015. She also sang a Marathi song 'Toofan Aalaya', the Satyamev Jayate Water Cup Anthem

Personal life

Rao married actor Aamir Khan in December 2005, after Khan divorced his first wife Reena Dutta in 2002. They met on the sets of Lagaan. Rao was one of the film's assistant directors. They were living in Bandra, a Mumbai suburb. The couple have a son, Azad Rao Khan, born in December 2011, through a surrogate mother who has been named after Abul Kalam Azad.

Rao has been a vegan, and she had influenced her then-husband, Aamir Khan, to turn vegan as well. After discussing the issue, both of them decided to turn vegan.

On 3rd July 2021, Kiran Rao and Aamir Khan announced their decision to divorce after 15 years of marriage via a joint statement where they thanked their family and friends for their continuous support in this matter. They will continue to nurture their son Azad Khan (born 2011) as co-parents.

Filmography

Director

Producer

Presenter

Singer

References

External links

 

Living people
1973 births
Indian women film directors
Hindi-language film directors
Konkani people
Indian atheists
Indian women screenwriters
Sophia College for Women alumni
Jamia Millia Islamia alumni
Indian women film producers
Hindi film producers
Sophia Polytechnic alumni
Film producers from Bangalore
Film directors from Bangalore
21st-century Indian film directors
21st-century Indian women artists
21st-century Indian businesspeople
Screenwriters from Bangalore
Women artists from Karnataka
Businesswomen from Karnataka
21st-century Indian businesswomen
People from Wanaparthy district